The 2010–11 AFC Bournemouth season is the club's first season back in Football League One after a two-year absence. During the 2010–11 English football season, Bournemouth participated in League One, the Johnstones Paint Trophy, the FA Cup, and the Football League Cup. Bournemouth were eliminated from the League Cup and the Johnstones Paint Trophy in the First Round and the FA Cup in the Second Round.

Season squad

Transfers

Transfers in

Transfers out

Loans in

Loans out

Competitions

Football League One

League table

Result round by round

Results

League Cup

FA Cup

Football League Trophy

Squad statistics
Appearances for Football League One matches only

|}

References

External links
 Fixtures and results at official Bournemouth website

AFC Bournemouth
2010-11